St Ninian and St Triduana's Church, Edinburgh is a Catholic church in the Restalrig district of Edinburgh, Scotland.

History
The original church was a wooden building and was established in 1906. The building of the current church began in 1932 and it was consecrated on 28 May 1933.

It is named after two ancient Scottish saints, Ninian and Triduana.

The church was renovated in the 1990s which included altering a portion of the nave to create a hall for meetings

The building was designed by Sir Giles Gilbert Scott, whose original plan was not completed due to the outbreak of World War II.

It is a Category B listed building.

Parish Organisation
From 2017 the parishes in Edinburgh were organised into clusters to better coordinate their resources. Ss Ninian and Triduana's is one of four parishes in Cluster 1 along with St Mary's Cathedral, St Patrick's and St Albert's.

References

External links
 Ninian and Triduana’s Church

Roman Catholic churches in Edinburgh
Listed Roman Catholic churches in Scotland
Category B listed buildings in Edinburgh
Listed churches in Edinburgh